A partial solar eclipse will occur on Wednesday, January 27, 2055. A solar eclipse occurs when the Moon passes between Earth and the Sun, thereby totally or partly obscuring the image of the Sun for a viewer on Earth. A partial solar eclipse occurs in the polar regions of the Earth when the center of the Moon's shadow misses the Earth. It will be visible across North America.

Related eclipses

Solar eclipses 2054–2058

References

External links 
 NASA graphics

2055 1 27
2055 in science
2055 1 27
2055 1 27